is a Japanese violinist, composer and arranger.

Hijiri began taking violin lessons at age 6 and studied under Yonosuke Ishii, Shizuko Ishii and Chikashi Tanaka. While attending Tokyo University of the Arts, he performed as a guest concert master at Tokyo City Philharmonic Orchestra and Sendai Philharmonic Orchestra.

Before graduating from the university, he became interested in playing non-classical music and started performing with Toshihito Nakanishi, who inspired him in many ways. Hijiri also started his career as a composer when he produced an album published together with a photobook by Kenji Ishikawa, Moonlight Blue. Hijiri handled string arrangements for albums and movies for Kome Kome Club and started his career as an arranger as well.

Hijiri worked on recordings, concerts with various artists, movies and video games as a soloist and with "Hijiri Kuwano strings group". He is credited in Whisper of the Heart, Shall We Dance, Nobody Knows, Kind of Love, Melody of Oblivion, Good Luck Girl!, Final Fantasy XIII and numerous other productions as a performer, composer and arranger.

He is also known as an original violin player for the battle theme "Blinded by Light" in Square Enix's Final Fantasy XIII (composed by Masashi Hamauzu). He works closely with Hamauzu and Imeruat (Masashi Hamauzu and Mina) as a supporting artist. He toured with Imeruat to Europe and Hong Kong and performed several pieces on "α" Clock: World Time, Sony Global website (composed by Masashi Hamauzu).

Produced/co-produced albums 
 Fiddler's Philosophy（), solo album）
 "Moonlight Blue" = Gekkōyoku, concept album with the photographer Kenji Ishikawa
 TBS Animation "Melody of Oblivion" soundtrack
 Nippon TV drama "Cinderella never sleeps" soundtrack
 Cardfight!! Vanguard overDress (TV)

References

External links
 Hijiri Kuwano Strings Group Discography - The Music of Visual art and games

1964 births
21st-century Japanese composers
21st-century Japanese male musicians
21st-century violinists
Japanese composers
Japanese male composers
Japanese music arrangers
Japanese violinists
Living people
Male violinists